The Canton of Saint-Dié-des-Vosges-Est is a French former administrative and electoral grouping of communes in the Vosges département of eastern France and in the region of Lorraine. It was disbanded following the French canton reorganisation which came into effect in March 2015. It consisted of 16 communes, which joined the canton of Saint-Dié-des-Vosges-2 in 2015. It had 19,795 inhabitants (2012).

One of 9 cantons in the Arrondissement of Saint-Dié-des-Vosges, the Canton of Saint-Dié-des-Vosges-Est had its administrative centre at Saint-Dié-des-Vosges.

Composition
The Canton of Saint-Dié-des-Vosges-Est comprised the following 16 communes:

 Ban-de-Laveline
 Bertrimoutier
 Coinches 
 Combrimont 
 Frapelle 
 Gemaingoutte 
 Lesseux 
 Nayemont-les-Fosses 
 Neuvillers-sur-Fave 
 Pair-et-Grandrupt 
 Raves 
 Remomeix 
 Saint-Dié-des-Vosges (eastern part) 
 Sainte-Marguerite
 Saulcy-sur-Meurthe 
 Wisembach

References

Former cantons of Vosges (department)
2015 disestablishments in France
States and territories disestablished in 2015